Eczacıbaşı Dynavit is the women's volleyball department of Eczacıbaşı S.K., a Turkish sports club based in Istanbul, Turkey. The team plays its home matches at the Eczacıbaşı Spor Salonu hall in Istanbul. Eczacıbaşı has won a record 16 Turkish League titles and a record nine Turkish Cups, amongst others. In the 2014–15 season they won the CEV Champions League and that gave them the ticket to capture the 2015 FIVB World Club Championship in Zürich, a year later the club became the first club in the world to win the FIVB World Club Championship back-to-back by defending their crown in the Philippines during the 2016 FIVB World Club Championship in Manila. Eczacıbaşı VitrA is the most successful Turkish volleyball club with 28 national championship titles overall since the introduction of a national league in 1956.

Team names
Due to sponsorship, the women's volleyball team have competed under the following names:
 Eczacıbaşı (1966-2007)
 Eczacıbaşı Zentiva (2007-2010)
 Eczacıbaşı VitrA (2010-2021)
 Eczacıbaşı Dynavit (2021-)

History
The club has invested in women's volleyball for approximately 40 years and has pioneered for Turkish women's volleyball. The team plays in the CEV Champions League regularly.

The international achievements of Eczacıbaşı have set an example for Turkish volleyball and contributed to the success of the Turkish National Women's Volleyball Team. With its systematic and modern approach to the sport and close to 40 years' experience, Eczacıbaşı is one of the most highly respected volleyball clubs in Europe.

Eczacıbaşı women's volleyball team won the European Cup Winners' Cup in 1999. The club also finished 2nd in the European Champion Clubs' Cup of 1980 and the CEV Cup of 1993; 3rd in the European Champion Clubs' Cup of 2000 and the Top Teams Cup of 2005; and 4th in the European Champion Clubs' Cup of 1984 and the Champions' League of 2001 and 2002; in the season 2014–15 won the CEV Champions League and the 2015 FIVB World Club Championship in Zürich, and a year later the club became won the FIVB World Club Championship back-to-back by defending their crown during the 2016 FIVB World Club Championship in Manila, becoming the first club in volleyball history to achieve this outstanding feat.

Eczacıbaşı has won more national championships than any other women's volleyball team in Turkey, with 27 Turkish League Championships under its belt since it entered the league in 1968. In the 1972–1973 season, the team began to set its first record of consecutive wins, winning 17 Turkish League titles in a row. It repeated this performance another five years between 1999 and 2003, when it also won five Turkish Cups.

Over the years, Eczacıbaşı has worked with many internationally renowned players, such as Irina Ilchenko (Irina Simirrnova), Lioubov Chachkova (Lioubov Kılıç), Yelena Godina, Antonina Zetova, Yevgeniya Artamonova, Tatyana Gracheva, Barbara Ružić (Barbara Jelić), Antonella Del Core, Mirka Francia, Neslihan Demir, Jordan Larson, Esra Gümüş, Gülden Kayalar and Kim Yeon-koung.

Team roster 2022–23

As of October 2022.

Technical staff 
As of July 2022

Honours

International competitions
 FIVB Volleyball Women's Club World Championship
Winners (2): 2015, 2016
 Runners-up (1): 2019
 Third (1): 2018
 CEV Women's Champions League
 Winners (1): 2014-15
 Runners-up (1): 1979-80
 Third (3): 1999-00, 2001–02, 2016-17
 CEV Cup
 Winners (3): 1998-99, 2017-18, 2021-22
 Third (1): 2004-05
 CEV Challenge Cup
 Runners-up (1): 1992-93

National competitions
 Turkish Women's Volleyball League
 Winners (16) (record): 1984–85, 1985–86, 1986–87, 1987–88, 1988–89, 1993–94, 1994–95, 1998–99, 1999–00, 2000–01, 2001–02, 2002–03, 2005–06, 2006–07, 2007–08, 2011–12
 Runners-up (7): 1989-90, 1990–91, 1992–93, 1997-98, 2012-13, 2017-18, 2018–19
 Third (9): 1991-92, 2003–04, 2004–05, 2009–10, 2010–11, 2013-14, 2014-15, 2015-16, 2021-22
 Turkish Women's Volleyball Championship (defunct)
 Winners (12) (record): 1972-73, 1973–74, 1974–75, 1975–76, 1976–77, 1977–78, 1978–79, 1979–80, 1980–81, 1981–82, 1982–83, 1983-84
 Runners-up (1): 1971-72
 Third (2): 1969-70, 1970–71
 Turkish Cup
 Winners (9) (record): 1998–99, 1999–00, 2000–01, 2001–02, 2002–03, 2008–09, 2010–11, 2011–12, 2018–19
 Runners-up (4): 1997-98, 2012–13, 2017–18, 2020–21
 Third (5): 2009-10, 2013–14, 2014–15, 2016–17, 2021–22
 Turkish Super Cup
 Winners (5) (record): 2011, 2012, 2018, 2019, 2020
 Runners-up (3): 2009-10, 2013–14, 2021–22

Notable players

Domestic Players

 Büşra Cansu
 Violet Duca
 Esra Gümüş
 Gülden Kayalar
 Özge Kırdar
 Bahar Mert
 Bahar Toksoy Guidetti
 Natalia Hanikoğlu
 Neslihan Demir
 Elif Ağca
 Naz Aydemir
 Neriman Özsoy
 Hande Baladın
 Simge Aköz

European Players

 Maria Borodakova
 Tatyana Gracheva
 Lioubov Sokolova
 Tatiana Kosheleva
 Yevgeniya Artamonova
 Yelena Godina	
 Irina Iltchenko
 Rosir Calderon

 Mirka Francia
 Antonella Del Core
 Jenny Barazza

 Maja Ognjenović
 Tijana Bošković
 Ivana Đerisilo
 Vesna Čitaković 
 Aleksandra Petrović

 Christiane Fürst
 Denise Hanke

 Helena Havelkova

 Antonina Zetova

 Barbara Jelić
 Mira Topic 
 Senna Ušić
 Dragana Marinković
 Maja Poljak

 Laura Heyrman

Non-European Players

 Natália Pereira
 Thaísa Menezes
 Andressa Picussa

 Jordan Larson
 Lauren Gibbemeyer
 Carli Lloyd
 Molly Kreklow	
 Christa Harmotto
 Nancy Metcalf
 Heather Bown
 Rachael Adams
 Tayyiba Haneef-Park
 Tracy Stalls
 Chiaka Ogbogu 
 Jordan Thompson
  McKenzie Adams

 Bethania de la Cruz

 Wang Yimei

 Stacey Gordon

 Kim Yeon-koung

Players written in italic still play for the club.

See also
 Eczacıbaşı
 Turkey women's national volleyball team
 Turkish women in sports

References

External links
Official website

Volleyball clubs established in 1966
Eczacıbaşı family
Women's volleyball teams in Turkey
Turkish volleyball clubs
Volleyball clubs in Istanbul